My Husband’s Wife also known as My Husband’s Woman (Egyptian Arabic: امرأة زوجي translit: Imra’at Zawgi or Emra'at Zawgy) is a 1970 Egyptian drama film written by Abo El Seoud El Ebiary and directed by Mahmoud Zulfikar. The film stars Salah Zulfikar, Nelly and Naglaa Fathi.

Plot 
Samia and Adel are a happy couple in their married life, her friend Nani deludes her that she is sick. Samia is convinced and goes to do tests, and the result is that her days in this world are going to end very soon, so she decides to choose a wife for her husband after her. She does everything she can to bring her and her husband closer, so that she can be assured of his future afterwards.

Cast 

 Salah Zulfikar: Adel
 Nelly: Samia
 Naglaa Fathi: Wafaa
 Hassan Mustafa: Mamdouh
 Mimi Gamal: Namy
 Hussein Ismail: Wafaa’s father
 Laila Yousry: Haneya
 Mukhtar Al Sayed: Waiter

See also 
 Salah Zulfikar filmography
 List of Egyptian films of 1970
 List of Egyptian films of the 1970s

References

External links 

 My Husband’s Wife on elCinema

1970 films
1970s Arabic-language films
1970 drama films
Films shot in Egypt
Egyptian drama films
Egyptian black-and-white films